The 2012 Tiburon Challenger was a professional tennis tournament played on hard courts. It was the sixth edition of the tournament which was part of the 2012 ATP Challenger Tour. It took place in Tiburon, California, United States between 8 and 14 October 2012.

Singles main-draw entrants

Seeds

 1 Rankings are as of October 1, 2012.

Other entrants
The following players received wildcards into the singles main draw:
  Christian Harrison
  Bradley Klahn
  Michael McClune
  Daniel Nguyen

The following players received entry as a special exempt into the singles main draw:
  Daniel Kosakowski

The following players received entry from the qualifying draw:
  Jeff Dadamo
  Chris Guccione
  Nicolas Meister
  Frederik Nielsen

Champions

Singles

 Jack Sock def.  Mischa Zverev, 6–1, 1–6, 7–6(7–3)

Doubles

 Rik de Voest /  Chris Guccione def.  Jordan Kerr /  Andreas Siljeström, 6–1, 6–4

External links
Official Website

Tiburon Challenger
Tiburon Challenger
2012 in American tennis
2012 in sports in California